Odhava is a small village located in Patan Taluka in Northern district of Patan, Gujarat, India.

Villages in Patan district